David Gogokhia (born 16 July 1987 in Jvari, Georgia) is a Georgian experimental visual artist, director of photography, and video editor, specialize in music videos, commercials etc

Early life
David was born in Jvari (Georgia). He spent part of his childhood growing up in Moscow, Russia until his family moved to Georgia. After graduating from Georgian Technical University in 2008, he began working as a web designer for a while. Later, he left a job and started direct music videos, short films, commercials etc.

Filmography 
2013
 Mister Dzidza (Director of Photography)

Music videography 
2014
Lasha Kicks feat. Nina Sublatti - "Toxic"
Nиkas - "From the Inside"

2015
Anri Jokhadze - "თოვლი მოდის" (Cinematographer)
Mariam Chachkhiani - "Gibberish"
Nina Sublatti - "Warrior" |  This song represented Georgia in the Eurovision Song Contest 2015.
Nina Sublatti - "I’ve Got An Idea"
Nina Sublatti - "Dark Desire"

2016
Mariam Chachkhiani feat. Jambazi - "Fly Away" 
Cool Company - "Slice of Paradise"

2017
BB Thomaz - "Now You Want It"

2018
Hamin Reed - "Disrelish"

2019

Nitepunk - "We Go Back"

References

External links

Press 
 "Gibberish" music video Premiere on Music Box Georgia, directed by David Gogokhia
 Studio BigCAKE Shoots Video Clip for the Song "Warrior"

1987 births
Music video directors
Living people
Film directors from Georgia (country)